The genus Selenotypus includes one of the largest of Australia's theraphosids. At present, the only recognised species within this genus is Selenotypus plumipes, but this is expected to change, as it is becoming apparent that the genus has a wide distribution, and at present Australian theraphosids as a whole are poorly classified.

Morphology
Selenotypus plumipes is one of Australia's largest spiders. Primarily various shades of brown in colour, it is characterised by its 4th legs being longer than its forelegs, and it has large piloerect bristles on its back two pairs of legs. This has led to its common name of the "Australian Featherleg".

Venom 
S. plumipes venom is used in insecticide development. Hardy et al., 2013 isolate and employ the venom, demonstrating efficacy as an insecticide.

Behaviour
Like all Australian theraphosids, and old world tarantulas in general, S. plumipes are shy and reclusive by nature, and defensive if disturbed. The species has a reputation for being calmer than other Australian species. Like most Australian tarantulas, S. plumipes has the ability to make a hissing noise if agitated, known as stridulation.

In the wild, S. plumipes inhabit arid-zone grassland regions, and such are adapted to live in these harsh conditions. The species are obligate burrowers, constructing burrows up to 50 cm in depth, which helps maintain temperature. During bush-fires, they have been seen to place snail-shells over their burrows to keep out the heat.

They are largely opportunistic predators, and will take most prey items it can overpower. There has been verified instances of small birds from farms, such as baby chickens, having been preyed upon by these spiders. The venom of these spiders is not deadly to humans, but mechanical damage from the penetration of the large fangs can be caused, and local symptoms such as swelling and pain can be felt. In some rare instances, more general systemic symptoms such as nausea can be felt. Its venom contains the most powerful insecticidal peptide in the world of spiders.

Species
Selenotypus plumipes Pocock, 1895 — Queensland

In captivity
The keeping of tarantulas in captivity is a growing hobby in Australia, but with the country's strict import laws, only local species can be kept. As one of Australia's slowest-growing species, S. plumipes is not ideal according to Queensland Museum.

A glass fish tank is sufficient for keeping tarantulas, with a variety of substrates, peat moss or coconut peat being most often recommended. It is best to recreate conditions in the wild as best as possible. Humidity is important, especially when the spider is moulting, although fresh air should be allowed to circulate. A shallow water bowl should be provided. Misting of the tank is recommended if the tank becomes dry.

When young, the spider can be fed quite regularly, but as it grows older, it is not necessary to feed it more than once or twice a week. Prey items can include crickets, wood cockroaches, mealworms and, when fully grown, pinkie mice.

Thousands of tarantulas are estimated to be taken from the wild each year, mostly from Queensland. This rate of harvest is clearly unsustainable. Some collectors are using their spiders for captive breeding. For the fast-growing bigger species, such as Phlogius crassipes, this is a better solution than wild harvest.

Although S. plumipes is fairly docile compared to other Australian tarantulas, it is nevertheless venomous, and should not be handled.

References 

Spiders of Australia
Theraphosidae
Monotypic Theraphosidae genera